Utz Spur is a ridge named after Loreen G. Utz, United States Geological Survey (USGS) cartographer, a member of the satellite surveying team at South Pole Station, winter party 1983.

Ridges of Victoria Land
Scott Coast